Coalmine Records is a Brooklyn, New York-based independent hip-hop record label. Coalmine's catalog includes Pharaohe Monch, El Da Sensei, Kool G. Rap, Talib Kweli, Large Professor, Heltah Skeltah, Dilated Peoples, Bekay, Big K.R.I.T, Custom Made, Emilio Rojas, Torae, Skyzoo, Termanology, Alchemist, J.R.Rotem, M-Phazes, Illmind, Khrysis, Shuko, Domingo, DJ Kayslay, DJ Revolution, and DJ Babu.

History 
Coalmine Records was established in 2005. Its founder and C.E.O. is Matt Diamond. The label's inaugural release was a 12-inch single that was distributed in April 2005 under Diamond's DJ moniker, titled DJ Dutchmaster Presents: "The Raw" featuring Saigon, Inspectah Deck & Bekay, the latter of which became Coalmine's first signed artist. "The Raw" highlights the classic east coast hip hop style that Diamond would model his label on. After receiving tremendous positive feedback and gracing countless mixshows and mixtapes worldwide, "The Raw" charted as college radio's number one hip hop song in the nation.

In August 2005, Coalmine released its second 12-inch single, this time featuring Supernatural, winner of the 1993 New Music Seminar MC battle and Guinness World Records holder for a nine-hour-long freestyle session. The single, "Altitude", produced by Marco Polo B/W "1-2 Punch", received acclaim from DJs nationwide and helped further brand Coalmine Records into the indie radio community.

For the first two years of the label's history, Coalmine's releases were exclusive to 12-inch singles. In 2007, Rawkus Record's, Rawkus 50 campaign was launched and included Coalmine's flagship artist Bekay as part of their artist roster. Bekay's album The Horror Flick LP was released on November 27, 2007, along with the other members of the Rawkus 50. The LP was released with much praise from the hip hop community and strengthened Bekay's online presence and overall visibility to help set the stage for his Coalmine debut with his full-length LP, Hunger Pains.

Due to the significant decline in vinyl sales, Coalmine Records adapted to a digital platform and signed a label deal with The Orchard in January 2008. Towards the end of 2008, Coalmine Records began to digitally distribute several hip hop titles, which include but are not limited to El Da Sensei & The Returners Global Takeover: New Beginning, CL Smooth "Perfect Timing" featuring Skyzoo (Digi-12"), Bekay's Horror Flick Remix EP and more. In April 2009, Coalmine released The Foundation: A Compilation Produced Entirely by Shuko. The project is hosted by Heltah Skeltah and mixed by DJ Dutchmaster. This release is considered to be Coalmine's first full-length physical & digital release and was received with much acclaim. The Foundation includes several features and guest appearances including Skyzoo, Dre Robinson, Jae Millz, Papoose, Rakim, Talib Kweli, Bad Seed, Bekay, Canibus, Chino XL, Big Noyd, Krondon, Phil the Agony, Craig G., Mr. Met (of Brooklyn Academy), Torae, Shabaam Sahdeeq, DJ Revolution, Heltah Skeltah, HellRazah, Cuban Link, SoulStice, R.A. the Rugged Man, & more.

By the third quarter of 2009, Coalmine Records began the promotional campaign for Bekay's Hunger Pains, which was released on November 10, 2009. The album's maxi-single was released on August 25 with The Alchemist produced "I Am" feat. DJ Revolution B/W "Brooklyn Bridge" featuring the legendary Masta Ace & production by DJ Babu (of Dilated Peoples). The album includes guest appearances from Masta Ace, Dilated Peoples, Saigon, Inspectah Deck, R.A. the Rugged Man, Heltah Skeltah, Wordsworth and DJ Revolution. Producers featured include The Alchemist, Illmind, DJ Babu, Shuko, BeanOne and more. Hunger Pains, ranked among several lifestyle and blogs sites as one of the best hip-hop albums for 2009 and even qualified as an honorable mention among the year's top albums by the legendary DJ Premier.

Coalmine Records continues to expand their growing artist roster with the digital distribution of releases from the Brown Bag AllStars, Cimer Amor & Custom Made. In July 2010, Coalmine Records signed a physical distribution deal with Nail Distribution/Allegro Media Group. The first release under their new deal was Global Takeover 2: Nu World (GT2), the sequel to El Da Sensei & The Returners Global Takeover LP. The album has since been revered as El's best solo effort since the 2002 release of Relax, Relate, Release (Seven Heads Entertainment Ltd.). GT2 features production from the Polish production duo p/k/a The Returners and boasts features from Treach (of Naughty by Nature), Sean Price, Bekay, Rakaa Iriscience, John Robinson, Reks, Akrobatik, Tiye Phoenix, MeLa Machinko & M-Phazes.

April 19, 2011, marked the release of Can You Dig It?, a digital-only compilation containing 15 tracks from the label's singles catalog, released in celebration of the label's five-year anniversary.

Diamond Media 360 

In the second quarter of 2011, Diamond incorporates Diamond Media 360 (DM360), a label, marketing & lifestyle brand that will become the parent company of Coalmine Records.  Diamond Media 360 will launch in three tiers, starting with an overhaul of CoalmineRecords.com, followed by the launch of DiamondMedia360 and lastly, TakinMines.com, a hip-hop lifestyle webzine.  DM360 functions as a multi-dimensional marketing one-stop, designed to provide independent artists with label services that includes project consulting, online marketing, digital distribution and radio promotions.

Artists 
Bekay 
Brown Bag AllStars
Cimer Amor
Custom Made
El Da Sensei
M-Phazes
One Dae

Discography

12-Inch Vinyl/Digi-Singles

EPs

Full Length/Compilations

References 

http://www.hiphopdx.com/index/album-reviews/id.1135/title.coalmine-records-presents-the-foundation
http://www.ballerstatus.com/2009/05/28/coalmine-records-breaks-down-their-midnight-madness-remix-ep/
https://web.archive.org/web/20110312204748/http://www.allthatsfab.com/2009/04/14/fab-man-of-the-week-matt-diamond
http://hiphopgame.ihiphop.com/index2.php3?page=djdutchmaster
http://www.hiphopdx.com/index/dxnext/id.137/title.bekay
https://web.archive.org/web/20120322064618/http://www.refinedhype.com/hyped/entry/nxne-the-southwest-invasion/
http://www.wevegotthejazz.com/?p=9359
https://web.archive.org/web/20110521091253/http://fludwatches.com/collab/coalmine-records-x-fld

External links 
 CoalmineRecords.com
 DiamondMedia360.com
Coalmine Records (Label/Brand)-Underground Hip Hop-Store
 Coalmine Records Twitter

American independent record labels
Hip hop record labels
New York (state) record labels